= David Vogenitz =

American poet and author

David George Vogenitz (1930 – 17 September 2003) was an American poet and author. He also wrote under the name David George.

He wrote on Flamenco and Gypsy culture, having lived for many years in Spain, including several years with gypsies.
